Georges Naisse (25 January 1914 – 4 October 2001) was a French racing cyclist. He rode in the 1938 Tour de France.

References

1914 births
2001 deaths
French male cyclists
Place of birth missing